The VIMOS-VLT Deep Survey (VVDS) is a redshift survey carried out by a collaboration between French and Italian astronomical institutes using the VIMOS spectrograph, mounted on the telescope Melipal (UT3) of the Very Large Telescope, located at the Paranal Observatory in Chile.

References

External links 
 VVDS Website
 VVDS public database

Astronomical surveys
Physical cosmology